The Kolpak ruling was made on 8 May 2003 in favour of Slovak handball player Maroš Kolpak, by the European Court of Justice. Maroš Kolpak had lost his contract with German handball club TSV Ostringen, as his team already had two non-EU players. Kolpak appealed to the European Court of Justice, claiming that he should not be considered as a non-EU player as he was a German resident, and Slovakia was part of the European Union Association Agreement. The court ruled in favour of Kolpak, and allowed citizens of countries that had free trade treaties with the EU, and were part of European Union Association Agreements, to work in any EU country. In March 2004, South African cricketer Claude Henderson became the first player to sign a Kolpak agreement, which ended his international career.

 
The ruling allowed citizens of around 100 nations to play cricket in any EU nation without being considered as an overseas player. The Cotonou Agreement allows the citizens of most Caribbean and African nations to be eligible for signing Kolpak agreements. However, the British Home Office stipulates that a player must have a valid work permit for four years or must have a specified number of appearances in international cricket to sign a Kolpak deal. Kolpak players older than 18 years can qualify to represent England after playing for seven years for a county and gaining citizenship. The England and Wales Cricket Board (ECB) pays £1,100 less to a county for each County Championship game and £275 less for each One Day match per Kolpak player who plays instead of a domestic cricketer. This is aimed at reducing the mass arrivals of overseas players into county cricket.

Cricketers born in British overseas territories can play county cricket as locals and need not sign Kolpak agreements. For instance, Omari Banks, who has played for the West Indies, was eligible to play for Leicestershire and Somerset as a local player because he is from Anguilla (a British overseas territory).

Kolpak deals are not possible once Britain withdrew from the European Union as part of Brexit.

List of players

References 

Kolpak